Stonados (also known as Stonado) is a 2013 American-Canadian science-fiction action disaster television film directed by Jason Bourque. It is set in Boston and was filmed in Victoria, British Columbia.

Synopsis
A tourist group see a Waterspout that forms in the ocean off the coast of Plymouth Rock, then it quickly disappears. Meanwhile, a man playing basketball in Boston gets hit by the rock that falls from the sky out of nowhere.

Maddy, a police officer investigating the falling stones calls her brother Joe, a science teacher to help her investigate. Lee, a weather reporter and Joe’s friend also comes to the scene to investigate. They realize that the tornado formed in the sea may have thrown up stones from the sea floor. Joe’s son, Jackson, and Daughter, Megan, have gone to the harbor by themselves, Joe tries to phone them but he can’t get hold of them.

Ben, a lighthouse keeper on Little Brewster Island, phones Joe telling him about the tornados he is seeing forming in the sea off the coast which is picking up stones and throwing them. The tornados are forming near the harbor, so Joe makes an announcement to evacuate the harbor area.

A waterspout forms in the middle of the harbor, forming a tornado, starts throwing stones onto the surrounding land, injuring people and destroying buildings. Everyone runs from the harbor, as Joe and Lee search the area to find his children. Maddy turns up as the tornado dies down. Joe finds his children who have safely survived the storm. Lee predicts that there will be a lot more tornados forming due to recent volcanic eruptions in the area. Joe runs some computer simulations which back up Lee’s predictions.

Another tornado forms in the ocean, and one of the stones hits a car. Joe, Lee and Maddy investigate finding that the stone is extremely cold, it explodes and shatters destroying the car. The biggest tornado yet forms in the Charles river basin, throwing out stones on both sides of the river, causing widespread destruction and killing many people. Lee and his cameraman televise this event, and advise people to stay in their homes. The Field Operating Agency (FOA) see this announcement and want to organize a widespread evacuation of the coastal areas. Joe predicts that the tornados might move inland, causing even more destruction.

A ship gets caught in a tornado and heads towards Little Brewster Island. Ben tells the ship to change its course, but as he is doing this a flying stone hits his lighthouse which collapses on top of him.

A tornado forms inland, destroying many buildings. Although Joe, Lee and Maddy are caught in the storm, they escape unscathed. Joe surmises that the recent volcanic eruption have created atmospheric instability, causing frozen Ozone droplets to form in the atmosphere, which the tornados are pulling down and throwing. Due to the atmospheric pressure change the frozen Ozone is also likely to explode when it lands.

Meanwhile, Megan and Jackson decide to go and watch a football game. Joe, Maddy and Lee go to pick them up, taking backstreet roads to avoid traffic. However the roads are scattered with frozen stones which they have to navigate through before they explode. The tyres of their van are destroyed by one of the explosions, so they abandon the vehicle and walk on foot. The tornado hits the football stadium, everyone is evacuated. Joe, Maddy and Lee arrive at the stadium and rescue Megan and Jackson.

Joe realizes that the tornados could be stopped by raising the temperature of the atmosphere, which can be done by exploding a bomb high in the atmosphere. They manage to get to the FOA, and tell them the solution. They provide Joe with the bomb needed. Another tornado forms, which Joe must launch the bomb into so it is sucked up into the atmosphere. Joe and Lee drive towards the tornado with the bomb and jump out of the car just as it is sucked into the tornado. The bomb explodes dissipating the tornado and warming the atmosphere enough to disperse the freak weather, preventing any more tornados from forming.

Cast
Paul Johansson as Joe Randall, a science professor 
Sebastian Spence as Lee Carlton, a weather reporter
Miranda Frigon as Maddy, a police officer (Joe's Sister)
Jessica McLeod as Megan, is Joe's daughter
Dylan Schmid as Jackson, is Joe's son
William B. Davis as Ben, a lighthouse keeper 
Thea Gill as Tara Laykin, head of the FOA

References

External links

2013 television films
2013 films
2010s disaster films
2013 science fiction action films
American disaster films
American science fiction action films
Syfy original films
Films set in Boston
Films shot in British Columbia
Culture of Victoria, British Columbia
2010s English-language films
Films directed by Jason Bourque
2010s American films